Vattenvisan ("The Water Song") is a children's song with lyrics by Lennart Hellsing and Lille Bror Söderlundh, and published in 1960 in Våra visor 3. The song was written for the school radio programme Bara vanligt vatten in 1957, and originally had seven verses. During publication, two of them were removed.

Publication
Våra visor 3, 1960
Barnvisboken, 1977, as "Dripp dropp dripp dropp (Vattenvisan)"
Smått å gott, 1977
Barnens svenska sångbok, 1999, under the lines "Sånger för småfolk".
Barnvisor och sånglekar till enkelt komp, 1984

Recordings
An early recording was done by Kerstin Andeby's children's choir & Peter Wanngren's band, and originally released as a record in 1995..

References

Barnens svenska sångbok (1999)

1957 songs
Swedish children's songs
Swedish-language songs
Songs with lyrics by Lennart Hellsing